Aeolia (minor planet designation: 396 Aeolia) is a typical main belt asteroid. It was discovered by the French astronomer Auguste Charlois on 1 December 1894 from Nice, and may have been named for the ancient land of Aeolis. The orbital plane is inclined at an angle of 2.5° to the plane of the ecliptic. This is the largest member of the eponymously named Aeolia asteroid family, a small group of asteroids with similar orbits that have an estimated age of less than 100 million years.

This rules out a previous estimate of 22.2 hours. It is a metallic Xe type asteroid in the SMASS classification.

References

External links
 
 

Aeolia asteroids
Aeolia
Aeolia
Xe-type asteroids (SMASS)
18941201